Catoptria corsicellus is a species of moth in the family Crambidae described by Philogène Auguste Joseph Duponchel in 1836. It is found on Corsica and Sardinia.

References

Crambini
Moths of Europe
Fauna of Corsica
Fauna of Sardinia
Moths described in 1836